Carey Allen Trimble (September 13, 1813 – May 4, 1887) was an American physician and politician who served two terms as a U.S. Representative from Ohio from 1859 to 1863.

Biography 
Born in Hillsboro, Ohio, Trimble attended Pestalostian School in Philadelphia, Pennsylvania, and Stubb's Classical School in Newport, Kentucky.  He graduated from Ohio University at Athens, Ohio in 1833 and from Cincinnati Medical College (now part of University of Cincinnati) in 1836.  He taught for four years, and practiced medicine in Chillicothe, Ohio.

Trimble was elected as a Republican to the Thirty-sixth and Thirty-seventh Congresses (March 4, 1859 – March 3, 1863).  He was an unsuccessful candidate for reelection.  He resumed medical practice.  He moved to Columbus, Ohio, where he died May 4, 1887.  He was interred in Grandview Cemetery, Chillicothe, Ohio.

Sources

1813 births
1887 deaths
People from Hillsboro, Ohio
Politicians from Chillicothe, Ohio
Ohio University alumni
University of Cincinnati College of Medicine alumni
Burials at Grandview Cemetery (Chillicothe, Ohio)
Physicians from Ohio
19th-century American politicians
Politicians from Columbus, Ohio
Republican Party members of the United States House of Representatives from Ohio